Amparanoia is the pseudonym of Spanish singer/guitarist Amparo Sánchez combining her first name with the word 'paranoia'. It was also the name of the band she fronted from 1996 to 2006. Debut album, El Poder de Machín, has been described as being "bright, exuberant... with a heavy Latin influence", whereas the 2002-released Somos Viento  has been called "a more 
acoustic blend of Cuban and reggae forms".

Biography 
Born in Granada, Spain, in 1970, Amparo Sánchez joined her first band, the Correcaminos (Roadrunners) at 16, a year after apparently becoming a mother for the first time. With Billie Holiday as her chief inspiration, her ability at singing blues, soul, rock, and jazz quickly established Sánchez as the foremost vocalist in the region. She formed Amparo & the Gang in the early '90s and the group released Haces Bien on Fabrica Magnetica in 1993, only to see the label fold two months later. Amparo & the Gang broke up and, despite plenty of work opportunities around Granada, Sánchez wanted to escape being locked into the blues circuit and moved to Madrid.

Starting in 1995, she spent 18 months developing an enthusiastic following playing around the Spanish capital's active club circuit. She also expanded her musical range by absorbing classic Cuban forms through exposure to Madrid's healthy Latin music scene while Manu Chao schooled her in other Caribbean styles. Sánchez developed a side group named Ampáranos del Blues (Protect Us From the Blues), that toured parts of Spain and southern France.

By December 1996, the first edition of Amparanoia (the wordplay gets better once you know it comes from the verb amparar, meaning to protect) was recording its first demo and quickly landed a deal with the Edel label. Amparanoia's 1997 debut album, El Poder de Machín (a reference to bolero-singer Antonio Machín), is a bright, exuberant disc with a heavy Latin influence, but each of the group's three releases has a distinct flavor. The hard-charging Feria Furiosa, released in 1999, reflects the participation of a contingent of radical Basque rock and punk musicians.

The line-up that made these albums fell apart late 1999. Amparo went on to record an album of children's songs which she released as Los Bebesones. 

A trip to Mexico late  2000 left its mark when she came into contact with the Zapatista communities in Chiapas. On returning to Spain, she organized a sound system mini-tour with like-minded musician friends to raise funds and Sánchez also went back to Mexico in March 2001 to take part in the Zapatista caravan in Mexico City. 

2002's Somos Viento resurrects a more acoustic blend of Cuban and reggae forms but with an Amparanoia twist. Violist Vesko Kountchev is from Bulgaria and introduces a new Balkan flavor to the mix, which is typical since the group lineup and guest artists always come from a wide range of musical cultures and usually a song or two per album has verses sung in English or French. But the international flavor of Amparanoia's evolving sound just seems to be a natural outgrowth of Amparo Sánchez's open, inviting musical personality.

In 2003, the year that Enchilado was released, Amparo recorded Don't Leave Me Now with Calexico as backing musicians. The track appeared in 2004 on compilation Rebeldía con Alegría which covers all her albums except Bebesones. 

In 2006 Amparanoia released their final album La Vida Te Da and recorded a live CD/DVD at the Barcelona Sala Apollo in November. Seguire caMinando was released in 2008 and promoted on a byebye-tour. 

In 2010, Amparo Sánchez released her debut solo album Tucson-Habana.

Discography

Albums 
El Poder de Machín 1997
Feria Furiosa 1999
Somos Viento 2002
Enchilao 2003
Rebeldía con Alegría 2004
La Vida Te Da 2006
Seguiré caminando 2008
Tucson-Habana 2010
Himnopsis Colectiva 2021

Singles 
Hacer Dinero 1997
En La Noche 1997
Me Lo Hago Sola 1997
Que Te Den 1998
¿Que Será De Mí? 1999
Desperado 1999
La Pared 1999
La Maldición 1999
Llámame Mañana 2000
La Fiesta 2002
Somos Viento 2002
Mar Estrecho 2002
Ella Baila Bembe" 2002
Dolor Dolor" 2003
Dolor Dolor Alerta Trabajar 2003
Caravane 2004
Don't Leave me Now 2003
La Vida te Da 2006
La Vida te Da (corte ingles) 2006

Collaborations 
Més raons de pes. El tribut a Umpah-Pah. 2009, collaboration with Enrique Bunbury, Iván Ferreiro and Pep Blay as art director.

Musicians 1997 - 2008 
Amparo Sánchez (lead singer, guitar) 1996
Eldys Isak Vega (piano, drums, percussion) 1998 - 2006
Jose Alberto Varona  (trumpet) 1999
Tomas Runquist (guitar, sitar, chorus) 2002, 2008
Carmen Niño (bass, chorus)  2001
Frank Padilla (drums, percussion) 2002
Vesko Kountchev  (viola, percussion) 2001 - 2004, 2008, 2017
Susana Ruiz (voice, chorus) - 2002
Jairo Zavala (guitar) 1997
Jordi Mestres (double bass, guitar) 2005
Daniel Tejedor (drums) 2005 - 2006, 2008
Robert Johnson (guitar) 1997 - 1999
Piluca la Terremoto (voice, chorus) 1997 - 1999
Yago Salorio (bass) 1997 - 1999
Andrés Cisneros (percussion) 1997 - 1998
Sito Camacho (percussion) 1997 - 1998
Alfonso Rivas (percussion) 1998 - 1999
Namsan Fong (guitar) 2004 - 2005
Caridad Borges (piano) 2004 - 2005
Nestor "el Yuri" (percussion) 2001 - 2006, 2008
Lazaro Ordoñez (trombone) 2008
Oscar Ferret (piano) 2008
Joel Dominguez (bajo) 2008

References

External links 
 Amparanoia Official Web Site

Spanish musical groups
Wrasse Records artists